Afriberina is a genus of moths in the family Geometridae.

Species
 Afriberina tenietaria (Staudinger, 1900)
 Afriberina terraria (A. Bang-Haas, 1907)

References
 Afriberina at Markku Savela's Lepidoptera and some other life forms

Boarmiini
Geometridae genera